An Unfinished Life is a 2005 American drama film directed by Lasse Hallström, and based on the Mark Spragg novel of the same name. The film stars Robert Redford, Jennifer Lopez, and Morgan Freeman. It is the story of a gruff Wyoming rancher (Redford) who must reconcile his relationship with his struggling daughter-in-law (Lopez) and previously-unknown-to-him granddaughter, after they show up unexpectedly at his ranch and ask to stay with him and his disabled best friend and neighbor (Freeman).

Plot 
One year ago, a bear stole a calf from Mitch and Einar's ranch. The two friends attempted to save the calf, but the bear viciously attacked Mitch — and because Einar was drunk, he failed to save Mitch from serious injury. The bear escaped into the mountains.

A year later, Mitch's wounds still cause him constant pain. Einar cares for Mitch daily, giving him morphine injections, food, and friendship. He leans his guilt on emotional crutches, while Mitch struggles to walk with real crutches. The bear is later seen foraging for food in town. Sheriff Crane Curtis captures it and it ends up in the town zoo. About the same time, Einar's long-lost daughter-in-law Jean shows up on his doorstep.

Jean and her young daughter, Griff move in with Einar and Mitch. Einar's son, Griffin, had married Jean years ago. She discovered that she was pregnant with Griff after Griffin died in a car accident, after which the family broke up. Tension exists between Einar and Jean, as both are still grieving for Griffin; tensions build as Einar has always blamed Jean for his son's death.

Since Griffin died, Jean has been in a series of unsuccessful relationships. She moved in with Einar to escape her abusive boyfriend, Gary. Jean starts working at a local coffee shop to earn money to become independent. There she befriends Nina, another waitress. Sheriff Curtis also becomes her friend.

Meanwhile, Gary has tracked Jean down and appears in town. Initially, Einar and the sheriff throw him out of town. Einar asks Jean to tell him how Griffin died. Jean says they flipped a coin to determine who would drive, and she lost. At 3 a.m., the two tired souls had set out on the last leg of a long trip. Jean fell asleep at the wheel. The car flipped six times. Griffin died, but Jean survived. When Einar learns the truth about his son's death, he says they'll have to talk about Jean moving out. Jean says she's through talking. The next morning she takes Griff with her and leaves to stay with Nina, who ends up helping her understand Einar's gruff ways and bitterness.

Griff, who has begun to build a relationship with her grandfather, leaves her mother and goes back to the ranch alone. Einar meets Jean at the diner and invites her to come back and live with him after he and Griff go on a camping trip.

The "camping trip" is a cover story meant to allow them time to carry out a request from Mitch to set free the bear who mauled him. The plan to get the bear into a transport cage does not go well. Griff accidentally knocks the gearshift lever into neutral while Einar is luring the bear into the cage. The bear gets free, and Einar is injured as he jumps out of the way. Griff drives Einar to the hospital, where he and Jean attempt to reconcile. Back at the ranch, Mitch survives a peaceful confrontation with the bear from his past. It goes into the mountains, where it belongs.

Meanwhile, Gary returns to the area and comes to the ranch the next day to accost Jean. He and Einar have an explosive confrontation that ends in Einar threatening Gary with his rifle, before badly beating him up. Gary, battered and exhausted, leaves on a Trailways bus as it moves through Nebraska.

In the final scene, Einar affectionately talks with one of his cats, who throughout the whole story he'd coldly ignored. Griff invites Sheriff Curtis for lunch when he drops by to see Jean (previously Griff, knowing of her mother fooling around with Sheriff, had told him not to stay for lunch). All is well as Mitch narrates the last seconds of the story, describing to Einar his dreams of flying above the earth and coming to understand things about life.

Cast

Production 
While set in Wyoming, An Unfinished Life was actually filmed in the Canadian towns of Ashcroft, Savona, and Kamloops, British Columbia.

Release

Critical reception 
Reviews of the film were mixed. The film holds a 52% approval rating on review aggregator site Rotten Tomatoes, based on 142 reviews with an average rating of 5.80 out of 10. The website's critical consensus reads: "A story of disjointed family members yearning for true emotional depth, An Unfinished Life teeters between overtly saccharine sentiments and moments of real intimacy."

Box office 
An Unfinished Life did not open well; it opened at number 16 in its limited release opening weekend with $1,008,308. In its second weekend, with a wider release, the film opened at number 11 with $2,052,066. Despite its $30 million budget, the film made only $18,618,284 worldwide by the time of its closing.

Awards 
The film won the best makeup award from the Canadian Network of Makeup Artists (Jayne Dancose), and it won the Genesis Award as best feature for 2005.

References

External links 
 
 
 
 
 
 
 

2005 films
2005 drama films
American drama films
Films about families
Films about grieving
Films directed by Lasse Hallström
Films scored by Deborah Lurie
Films set in Wyoming
Films shot in British Columbia
Initial Entertainment Group films
Miramax films
Revolution Studios films
The Ladd Company films
2000s English-language films
2000s American films